Daniel David Gonzales (born September 30, 1953) is a former Major League Baseball right fielder who played for the Detroit Tigers in 1979 and 1980.

External links

1953 births
Living people
Major League Baseball right fielders
Detroit Tigers players
Baseball players from California
Fullerton Hornets baseball players
American expatriate baseball players in Japan
Anderson Tigers players
Denver Bears players
Evansville Triplets players
Hanshin Tigers players
Lakeland Tigers players
Montgomery Rebels players
Oklahoma City 89ers players
Portland Beavers players
Rochester Red Wings players
Rocky Mount Leafs players
Tucson Toros players
Wichita Aeros players